İçerenköy is a neighbourhood located in the borough of Ataşehir on the Asian side of Istanbul, Turkey.

İçerenköy is home to the Swiss Hospital, the 5-star hotels Greenpark and Marriott, and Hasan Leyli Secondary School, which is the largest of its kind in Ataşehir.

Its proximity to transport amenities and ease of access, as well as its recent modernisation, make it a sought-after neighbourhood.

Neighbourhoods of Ataşehir